The Blind Date is a British television crime drama television series, written by Simon Booker, that first broadcast on ITV on 13 March 2000. The series, based upon the novel by Frances Fyfield, follows Lucy Kennedy (Zara Turner), a former police detective whose sister was murdered, and after a plot to ‘honey trap’ the prime suspect for the murder goes horribly wrong, Lucy's memories of the horrific incident are revived when a friend of hers goes on a horrific blind date with the suspected killer.

The series co-starred Mark Letheren, Hazel Ellerby, Peter Wight and Ben Miller, and was filmed in and around Highgate, Archway and Muswell Hill. The first episode drew 8.63 million viewers, while episode two drew just over 8 million. The series was released on VHS on 27 March 2000, alongside a fellow Miller-fronted ITV drama, Passion Killers. This remains the only home video release to date.

Cast
 Zara Turner as Lucy Kennedy
 Mark Letheren as Jack De Souza
 Hazel Ellerby as DCI Anthea Cooper
 Peter Wight as DI Harry Jenkins
 Samantha Beckinsale as Patty
 Ben Miller as Joe Maxwell
 Regina Freedman as Angela
 Roger Morlidge as John 'Owl' Jones
 Mark Aiken as Michael Smythe
 Maureen O'Brien as Mrs. Smythe
 Joanna David as Diana Kennedy
 Matthew James Thomas as Matthew Davey 
 Michael Elwyn as Gordon

References

External links

2000 British television series debuts
2000 British television series endings
2000s British crime television series
2000s British drama television series
2000s British television miniseries
English-language television shows
ITV television dramas
Television series by ITV Studios
Television shows set in London
London Weekend Television shows